The Grammy Award for Best Latin Rock or Alternative Album (until 2020: Best Latin Rock, Urban or Alternative Album) is an award presented at the Grammy Awards, a ceremony that was established in 1958 and originally called the Gramophone Awards, to recording artists for releasing albums in the Latin rock and/or alternative genres. Honors in several categories are presented at the ceremony annually by the National Academy of Recording Arts and Sciences of the United States to "honor artistic achievement, technical proficiency and overall excellence in the recording industry, without regard to album sales or chart position".

The category was introduced in 1998 and has gone through a number of name changes:
 1998-2008: Grammy Award for Best Latin Rock/Alternative Performance
 2009-2011: Grammy Award for Best Latin Rock, Alternative or Urban Album (for which this category merged with the Latin Urban Album category)
 2012: No Grammy was awarded (Grammy category was discontinued in a major overhaul of Grammy categories. That year, recordings in this category were shifted to the newly formed Best Latin Pop, Rock or Urban Album category. )
 2013-2020: Grammy Award for Best Latin Rock, Urban or Alternative Album
 2021 onwards: Grammy Award for Best Latin Rock or Alternative Album

In June 2020, the Recording Academy announced a renaming and redefining of this category. Latin urban albums were moved to the newly named Best Latin Pop or Urban Album category, as the Academy stated that "the Latin urban genre, both aesthetically and musically, is much more closely related to the current state of Latin pop."

Recipients

 Each year is linked to the article about the Grammy Awards held that year.
 In 2016, there was a tie for the award. Both artists were deemed winner individually.

See also

Grammy Award for Best Latin Pop, Rock or Urban Album

References

 
1998 establishments in the United States
Album awards
Awards established in 1998
Latin Rock, Urban or Alternative Album
Rock, Urban or Alternative Album
Latin Rock, Urban or Alternative Album
Latin alternative albums
Latin hip hop
Latin rock albums